Live at the Apollo is the first live album by James Brown and the Famous Flames, recorded at the Apollo Theater in Harlem and released in 1963 by King Records.

The album is included in Robert Christgau's "Basic Record Library" of 1950s and 1960s recordings, published in Christgau's Record Guide: Rock Albums of the Seventies (1981). In 2000 it was voted number 248 in Colin Larkin's All Time Top 1000 Albums. In 2003, the album was ranked number 25 on Rolling Stone magazine's list of The 500 Greatest Albums of All Time, maintaining the rating in a 2012 revised list, and re-ranking at number 65 in a 2020 reboot of the list. In 2004, it was one of 50 recordings chosen that year by the Library of Congress to be added to the National Recording Registry.

In 1998, this album was inducted into the Grammy Hall of Fame.

Release and reception 

Live at the Apollo was recorded on the night of October 24, 1962, at Brown's own expense. Although not credited on the album cover or label, Brown's vocal group, The Famous Flames (Bobby Byrd, Bobby Bennett, and Lloyd Stallworth), played an important co-starring role in Live at the Apollo, and are included with Brown by MC Fats Gonder in the album's intro. (It wasn't until the CD release of this album, decades later, that The Flames were finally credited for their work on this album). Brown's record label, King Records, originally opposed releasing the album, believing that a live album featuring no new songs would not be profitable. The label finally relented under pressure from Brown and his manager Bud Hobgood.

To King's surprise, Live at the Apollo was an amazingly rapid seller. It spent 66 weeks on the Billboard Top Pop Albums chart, peaking at #2. Many record stores, especially in the southeast US, found themselves unable to keep up with the demand for the product, eventually ordering several cases at a time. R&B DJs often would play side 1 in its entirety, pausing (usually to insert commercials) only to return to play side 2 in full as well. The side break occurred in the middle of the long track "Lost Someone".

Legacy
In a retrospective article for Rolling Stone, music critic Robert Christgau said that Brown was a "striking but more conventional performer" in the show than on his contemporary studio recordings and wrote of the album:

Brown went on to record several more albums at the Apollo throughout his career, including 1968's Live at the Apollo, Volume II (King), 1971's Revolution of the Mind: Live at the Apollo, Volume III (Polydor), and Live at the Apollo 1995 (Scotti Bros.).

In 2015, Rolling Stone listed it as the greatest live album of all time.

MC5 guitarist Wayne Kramer cited Live at the Apollo as the inspiration to Kick Out the Jams "Our whole thing was based on James Brown. We listened to Live at the Apollo endlessly on acid. We would listen to that in the van in the early days of 8-tracks on the way to the gigs to get us up for the gig. If you played in a band in Detroit in the days before The MC5, everybody did 'Please, Please, Please' and 'I Go Crazy.' These were standards. We modeled The MC5's performance on those records. Everything we did was on a gut level about sweat and energy. It was anti-refinement. That's what we were consciously going for."

CD reissues
Despite its renowned and historical significance, Live at the Apollo was not reissued on CD until 1990 because the original master recordings had been misplaced and the available copies were not of a high enough quality for a satisfactory CD release. 
The master tapes were recovered in late 1989. As Harry Weinger writes in the booklet of the reissued Deluxe Edition (featuring remastered sound and several alternate mixes) in 2004: "Finding the primary master, not the readily available copy, became a mission. It was tough to find, since the original LP didn't index individual tracks, meaning its song titles would not be properly listed in a database. The tape vault was 100,000 reels strong, and growing. As JB would say Good gawd. I shared this tale of woe with Phil Schaap, the noted jazz historian. One day, Philip was searching the vault for a Max Roach tape, his hand landed on what he thought was Max's master. Pulling the tape off the shelf, he realized he had instead an anonymous-looking audiotape box that said: 'Second Show James Brown'. It was initialed, in grease pencil, 'GR-CLS-King Records' (Gene Redd and Chuck L. Speitz). Phil handed it to me, saying with urgent economy, 'I think you need to hear this."

Track listing
The track listing is as it appears on the 2004 remaster. The original 1963 issue of the album is unindexed.

Personnel

James Brown & The Famous Flames
 James Brown – lead vocals
 Bobby Byrd – baritone/bass vocals (and keyboards on "Lost Someone")
 Bobby Bennett – first tenor vocals
 Lloyd Stallworth – second tenor vocals

Band
Lewis Hamlin – music director, trumpet
Hubert Perry – bass
Clayton Fillyau – drums
Les Buie – guitar, road manager
Lucas "Fats" Gonder – organ, MC
Clifford MacMillan – tenor saxophone
St. Clair Pinckney – tenor saxophone
Al "Brisco" Clark – tenor saxophone, baritone saxophone
William Burgess – alto saxophone
Dickie Wells – trombone
Roscoe Patrick – trumpet
Teddy Washington – trumpet

Technical
Dan Quest – art and cover (original LP)
Hal Neely – liner notes (original sleeve)
Tom Nola – location engineer
Chuck Seitz – editing, mastering (original LP)
Gene Redd – editing (original LP)
James Brown – producer

References

Further reading
 Wolk, Douglas. (2004). Live at the Apollo. New York: Continuum Books.

External links

Live at the Apollo (Adobe Flash) at Radio3Net (streamed copy where licensed)

United States National Recording Registry recordings
Grammy Hall of Fame Award recipients
James Brown live albums
1963 live albums
King Records (United States) live albums
Polydor Records live albums
Albums recorded at the Apollo Theater
Albums produced by James Brown
The Famous Flames albums
United States National Recording Registry albums